Simaria (also known as Simaria Kalan) is a village in the Simaria CD block in the Simaria subdivision of  the Chatra district in the Indian state of Jharkhand.

Geography

Location                             

Area overview
The map alongside shows that the forests (mark the light shading), covering around 60% of Chatra district, are evenly spread across the district. The map provides links to three CCL operational areas.

Note: The map alongside presents some of the notable locations in the district. All places marked in the map are linked in the larger full screen map.

Demographics
According to the 2011 Census of India, Simaria Kalan (location code 349347) had a total population of 2,412, of which 1,290 (53%) were males and 1,122 (47%) were females. Population in the age range 0–6 years was 356. The total number of literate persons in Simaria Kalan was 1,737 (84.48% of the population over 6 years).

Civic administration

Police station
Simaria police station serves Simaria CD block.

Subdivision and CD block HQ
Headquarters of Simaria subdivision and Simaria CD block is at Simaria village.

Education
Simaria Degree Mahavidyalaya was established at Simaria in 2015. Affiliated to the Vinoba Bhave University, it offers honours courses in Hindi, Urdu, English, history, geography, philosophy, political science, sociology, economics and anthropology.

References

Villages in Chatra district